Kiamesha Lake is a hamlet (and census-designated place) in the town of Thompson, in east-central Sullivan County, New York, United States. The zip code for Kiamesha Lake is 12751.

Kiamesha Lake is located on Route 42, between Monticello and Fallsburg, off New York State Route 17 (Future Interstate 86) exit 105B.

Travel and recreation 
Kiamesha Lake was the home to the Concord Resort & Golf Club and across the lake was the smaller family Hotel Gradus and Bungalow Colony. It is now home to several bungalow colonies and to the Resorts World Catskills hotel and casino.

Hasidic Community 
Kiamesha Lake is home to a year-round Hasidic community. It was originally a satellite community of the Vizhnitzer Hasidic Community of Monsey, New York, consisting of about 80 families.  Since the passing of the previous Vizhnitzer Rebbe of Monsey, Grand Rabbi Mordechai Hager on March 16, 2018, his son Rabbi Menachem Mendel Hager, the Chief Rabbi of the community, ascended to the title of Rebbe of the Vizhnitzer community of Kiamesha Lake. It is also home to a Vizhnitzer Yeshiva at the site of the former Gibber's Hotel.

Education 
 Hebrew Day School of Sullivan and Ulster Counties.
Vizhnitz Yeshiva (formerly Gibber Hotel)

References

External links 
Sullivan County, New York History
The Concord Resort & Golf Club
Viznitz Institutions - Building Torah and Kedusha in the Catskills

Hamlets in New York (state)
Hamlets in Sullivan County, New York